Janine François (born 1 January 1989) is a Trinidadian football midfielder.

International goals
Scores and results list Trinidad and Tobago' goal tally first.

References

External links 
 

1989 births
Living people
Women's association football forwards
Women's association football midfielders
Trinidad and Tobago women's footballers
People from Tobago
Trinidad and Tobago women's international footballers
Pan American Games competitors for Trinidad and Tobago
Footballers at the 2011 Pan American Games
Footballers at the 2015 Pan American Games
Competitors at the 2018 Central American and Caribbean Games
South Carolina State Lady Bulldogs soccer players
Trinidad and Tobago expatriate women's footballers
Trinidad and Tobago expatriate sportspeople in the United States
Expatriate women's soccer players in the United States